The temporal branches of the facial nerve (frontal branch of the facial nerve) crosses the zygomatic arch to the temporal region, supplying the auriculares anterior and superior, and joining with the zygomaticotemporal branch of the maxillary nerve, and with the auriculotemporal branch of the mandibular nerve.

The more anterior branches supply the frontalis, the orbicularis oculi, and corrugator supercilii, and join the supraorbital and lacrimal branches of the ophthalmic. The temporal branch acts as the efferent limb of the corneal reflex.

Testing the temporal branches of the facial nerve
To test the function of the temporal branches of the facial nerve, a patient is asked to frown and wrinkle their forehead.

Additional images

External links
  - "Branches of Facial Nerve (CN VII)"
 
 
 http://www.dartmouth.edu/~humananatomy/figures/chapter_47/47-5.HTM

References

Facial nerve